Halil Jaçellari (14 July 1940 – 23 October 2009) was an Albanian writer and translator.

Published works

Mirë mëngjes njerëz (Good morning people), 1976, story collection
Hapat e tij (His footsteps), 1978, story collection
Nesër është e djelë (Tomorrow is Sunday), 1988, novel
Nuk është kjo dashuria (This is not love), 1996, story collection
Përralla nga Hans Christian Andersen (Tales - Hans Christian Andersen), 1996, translation
Nick Sniffle and Dr. Yeah, 1997, translation
Tregimet e Guy de Maupassant (Short story collection - Guy de Maupassant), 1999, translation
Tregime (Story collection), 2002
Sezoni pa dasma (Wedding-less season), 2005, novel
Humnera e mëdyshjes (Abyss of ambiguity), 2009, novel

References

1940 births
2009 deaths
Albanian male writers
People from Lushnjë
English–Albanian translators
Translators from French
Albanian translators
Albanian novelists
Albanian male short story writers
Albanian short story writers
20th-century Albanian writers
21st-century Albanian writers
20th-century short story writers
21st-century short story writers
20th-century male writers
21st-century male writers
20th-century translators